Samuel Salva (born February 11, 1997) is a Filipino professional boxer. He is a one-time world title challenger, having fought for the IBF mini-flyweight title in 2019.

Professional boxing career
Salva defeated Rene Mark Cuarto on March 23, 2019, in an IBF world title eliminator, by unanimous decision. Two of the judges scored the fight 116–112 in his favor, while the third judge scored it 117–111 for him 

On September 7, 2019, he fought Pedro Taduran for the IBF mini-flyweight world title, losing by technical knockout in the 4th round despite knocking Taduran down in the 1st round.  He had to be carried out on a stretcher after the fight and required a hospital stay.  The fight was broadcast delayed on BoxNation. The Taduran-Salva title fight was the first all-Filipino title fight in the Philippines in 94 years.

Salva faced fellow former world title challenger Jeffrey Galero on April 30, 2022, following a 27-month absence from the sport. He won the fight by a first-round knockout, stopping Galero with just 14 seconds left in the opening round.

Professional boxing record

References

External links

1997 births
Living people
Filipino male boxers
Mini-flyweight boxers